Ballylenon is a radio situation comedy set in a small village in County Donegal in Ireland in the 1950s. The six series totalling 30 half-hour episodes were originally broadcast on BBC Radio 4 from 1994 until 1999.  The series was written by Christopher FitzSimon, and it starred T P McKenna, Stella McCusker and Margaret D'Arcy. A seventh and eighth series were broadcast in 2009 and 2010.  Music arranged and performed by Stephanie Hughes (Michael Harrison in Series 7 and 8).

Cast

Regular cast
 Phonsie Doherty - T P McKenna (Series 1-6), Gerard Murphy (Series 7-8)
 Muriel McConkey - Margaret D'Arcy
 Vera McConkey - Stella McCusker
 Vivienne Boal/Hawthorne - Aine McCartney 
 Stumpy Bonner - Gerard McSorley
 Guard Bernie Gallagher - John Hewitt (Series 1-6), Frankie McCafferty (Series 7-8)
 Rev Samuel Hawthorne - Gerard Murphy (Series 1-6), Miche Doherty (Series 7), Dermot Crowley (Series 8)

Recurring cast
 Josie Doherty - Ciara McKeown (Series 3), Cathy White (Series 4 and 5), Ali White (Series 6)
 Aubrey Frawley - Dominic Letts (Series 1), Matthew Addis (Series 7), Chris McHallem (Series 8)
 Packy McGoldrick - Charlie Bonnar (Series 3 and 5), Tim Loane (Series 4)
 Peg Sweeney - Anna Manahan, Marcella Riordan (Series 5)

Guest cast
 Polly Acton - Joanna Munro
 Terry Black - Mark Lambert
 Mr Boylan - Derek Bailey
 Consuela Dooley - Cathy Belton
 Eamonn Doyle - Patrick Fitzsymons
 Jonathan Ffrench O'Dowd - Wesley Murphy
 Primrose Ffrench O'Dowd, Eithne Ni Phartalain - Marcella Riordan
 Canon Friel, O'Brollachain - Kevin Flood
 Mr Mawhinney - Harry Towb
 Monsignor McFadden - Niall Cusack
 Father O'Flatley - John Guiney
 Daniel O’Searcaigh - James Greene 
 Bohunkus Smith - BJ Hogg
 RL Watson - Roma Tomelty

See also

 Baldi

External links
 
 

BBC Radio 4 programmes
BBC Radio comedy programmes
1994 radio programme debuts